The 1986–87 Detroit Red Wings season saw the Red Wings finish in second place in the Norris Division (NHL) with a record of 34 wins, 36 losses, and 10 draws for 78 points, a 38-point improvement from the previous season. They swept the Chicago Blackhawks in four games in the opening round, then rallied from a 3–1 deficit against the Toronto Maple Leafs in the division final, before falling to the eventual Stanley Cup champion Edmonton Oilers in five games in the Campbell Conference final. This season marked a turning point for the franchise. After making the playoffs just four times between 1967 and 1986, the Red Wings missed the playoffs only once between 1987 and 2016 (that coming in 1989–90).

Offseason

Regular season

Final standings

Schedule and results

Playoffs
The Red Wings finished the season 34–36–10, a major improvement over the disastrous 1985–86 campaign. Just missing out on first place
in the Norris Division, the Wings faced rival, Chicago in Round One. Detroit stunned the favored Blackhawks in a 4-game sweep, the franchise's first series victory since 1977–78. In the Norris Finals, Detroit faced another archrival, the Toronto Maple Leafs. The Leafs jumped out to a 3–1 series lead, but Detroit stormed back, winning the series in seven games, including a 3–0 win in the deciding game.
The Red Wings then faced the heavily-favored Edmonton Oilers in the Campbell Conference Finals. Detroit took Game One, but the
Oilers would eventually take the series in five games. Edmonton would go on to win the Stanley Cup.

Player statistics

Regular season
Scoring

Goaltending

Playoffs
Scoring

Goaltending

Note: GP = Games played; G = Goals; A = Assists; Pts = Points; +/- = Plus-minus PIM = Penalty minutes; PPG = Power-play goals; SHG = Short-handed goals; GWG = Game-winning goals;
      MIN = Minutes played; W = Wins; L = Losses; T = Ties; GA = Goals against; GAA = Goals-against average;  SO = Shutouts; SA=Shots against; SV=Shots saved; SV% = Save percentage;

Awards and records

Transactions

Draft picks
Detroit's draft picks at the 1986 NHL Entry Draft held at the Montreal Forum in Montreal, Quebec. The Red Wings initially selected Ian Kidd first overall in the 1986 NHL Supplemental Draft, but the claim was invalidated after it was determined Kidd didn't meet eligibility requirements.

Farm teams

See also
1986–87 NHL season

References

External links
 

Detroit
Detroit
Detroit Red Wings seasons
Detroit Red
Detroit Red